Yaacoubi is a surname. Notable people with the surname include:

Souad Yaacoubi, Tunisian politician
Ala Yaacoubi (born 1988), birth name of Tunisian rapper Weld El 15

See also
 Yaakoubi
 Yacoubian